Erik Larson is an American former competitive figure skater. He is the 1985 World Junior champion and won senior international medals at the Nebelhorn Trophy, Grand Prix International St. Gervais, and Skate Electric.

Personal life 
Erik Larson was born in 1968 in Scottsdale, Arizona. Erik is married to a figure skating coach Roseann Crowe Larson. They have a daughter Anabelle which is also a figure skater, born on September 9, 2005 in Ft.Lauderdale, Florida. Bella won the 2017 U.S. National Solo Dance Championships in Colorado Springs at the new World Arena and is the 2018 U.S. National Solo Dance Silver Medalist, which was held in Cape Cod, Mass. Her coaches are Marina Zoueva, Johnny Johns, Steven Belanger.

Career 
Larson began his skating at age five. He placed fourth at the 1984 World Junior Championships in Sapporo, Japan.

In December 1984, Larson won gold at the 1985 World Junior Championships in Colorado Springs, Colorado. He was coached by 1960 Squaw Valley Olympic bronze medalist Barbara Ann Roles Williams.

He invented the "Larson spin" in 1989 while training at The Broadmoor in Colorado Springs under Carlo Fassi and Janet Champion. That same year at the 1989 U.S. Nationals, Larson placed third in the short program and became an alternate for the World Championships. At the 1990 U.S. Olympic Festival in St. Paul Minnesota, Larson won the gold medal ahead of 1985 U.S. National Junior men's champion Doug Mattis.

He appeared as "Buttons the cellar boy" in Dorothy Hamill's Ice Capades "Cinderella Frozen in time". He also toured with Gershwin on Ice with Peggy Fleming and The Osmond Brothers tour in Las Vegas. Currently, he is the CEO for BellaICE Skating Events, a portable ice rink company, and coaches at Palm Beach Skate Zone in south Florida for the past 15 years.

Results

References

Navigation

American male single skaters
Living people
World Junior Figure Skating Championships medalists
Year of birth missing (living people)